Tiwai Island (Mende for 'Big Island') is a wildlife sanctuary and tourist site in Sierra Leone. Run by the non-governmental organization Environmental Foundation for Africa, Tiwai is 12 square kilometers in area and located on the Moa River in the Southern Province. It is also one of the largest inland islands in the country.

History
Tiwai belong to the Barri people until the late 19th century when Queen Nyarroh the Barri Chief gave half the Island to the Koya Chief whose territory was on the opposite side of the River Moa River where the Island is located.  From then on both peoples share ownership of the Island. In the late 1970s the Island was recognised as a special biosphere for wildlife conservation. Numerous natural scientists visited the island during the 1970s and 1980s, researching various aspects of its flora and fauna. Subsequently, some researchers along with the Barri and Koya people then requested that it became a wildlife sanctuary and in 1987 it was official designated a game reserve. Activities including community conservation program, ecological research, wildlife management, tourism and forestry management training took place on the Island.  Then, in 1991 civil war broke out in Sierra Leone financial support for the Tiwai was stopped and researchers and tourists were unable to reach the Island. After the end of the civil war the Environmental Foundation for Africa, a local Sierra Leonean NGO, rebuilt both tourism and researcher facilities on the island.

Geography
Tiwai Island is located in the Southern Province, 15 km from the town of Potoru on the Moa River 60 km from the Atlantic Ocean.  The Island has area of 1,200 hectares (12 km2) and is between 80 and 100 meters above sea level.  The climate on the Island is tropical with a rainy season between May and October and a dry season between December and March.  The average temperature is 27 °C and rainfall is about 3,000 mm a year.

Biology
The Island is home to a population of pygmy hippopotamus, over 135 different species of birds and "one of the highest concentration and diversity of primates in the world … 11 species."

References

 World Database on Protected Areas: Site Sheet, UN Environment Programme World Conservation Monitoring Centre, retrieved 7 November 2007

Islands of Sierra Leone
Southern Province, Sierra Leone
Protected areas of Sierra Leone
River islands of Africa